The following lists events that happened during 2001 in Armenia.

Incumbents
 President: Robert Kocharyan
 Prime Minister: Andranik Margaryan
 Speaker: Armen Khachatryan

Events

September
 September 25 - Pope John Paul II visits Armenia to participate on the celebrations of 1,700th anniversary of the adoption of Christianity as a national religion in Armenia.

References

 
2000s in Armenia
Years of the 21st century in Armenia
Armenia
Armenia
Armenia